The 2022 Mato Grosso do Sul gubernatorial election took place between October 2 (first round) and October 30 (second round). Voters elected a governor, vice governor, a senator, 8 federal and 24 state deputies. 

Eduardo Riedel was elected governor. The governor is elected for a four-year term starting January 1, 2023, and with the approval of Constitutional Amendment nº 111, ends on January 6, 2027.

Candidates

Candidates for the Federal Senate

References

2022 Brazilian gubernatorial elections
2022 elections in Brazil
October 2022 events in Brazil